Not Colored Too Perfect is the third album by Matt Nathanson, released in April 1998 on Acrobat Records.

Track listing
"All Been Said Before" – 3:01
"Church Clothes" – 2:58
"New Coats and New Hats" – 3:39
"Wait Up" – 3:56
"You're Smiling" – 3:29
"Miracles" – 4:16
"Clean" – 3:04
"Somewhere to Hide" – 3:24
"Vandalized" – 3:26
"Trace of a Cat's Eye" – 1:06

References
 Matt Nathanson official site

1998 albums
Matt Nathanson albums